Abell 7 is a faint planetary nebula located 1800 light-years away in the constellation of Lepus. It has a generally spherical shape about 8 light-years in diameter. Within the sphere are complex details that are brought out by narrowband filters. Abell 7 is estimated to be only 20,000 years old, but the central star, a fading white dwarf, is estimated to be some 10 billion years old.

References

External links
 

Abell 7
07
Lepus (constellation)